Blond Barbarians and Noble Savages is a 1975 collection of essays on the fantasy writers Robert E. Howard and H. P. Lovecraft by science-fiction writer L. Sprague de Camp, first published by T-K Graphics. It was reissued in 1986 by Borgo Press as number 2 in its Essays on Fantastic Literature series.

Contents
The work consists of an introduction and three essays, "Lovecraft and the Aryans," "Howard and the Celts," and "The Heroic Barbarian" (a revision of the author's earlier "Barbarians I Have Known"), together with bibliographies and an index. The second and third essays also appeared in de Camp's anthology of pieces on Howard, The Spell of Conan (1980). All three were reprinted in the later de Camp collection Rubber Dinosaurs and Wooden Elephants (1996).

Reception
The book was reviewed by Darrell Schweitzer in Fantasiae v. 3, no. 6, June 1975, J. Rosenbaum in Science Fiction Review Monthly 5, July 1975, Brian Stableford in Vector 81, May 1977, and Don D'Ammassa in Science Fiction Chronicle v. 10, no. 5, February 1989.

Notes

1975 books
American biographies
Essay collections
Essays about literature
Books by L. Sprague de Camp
Works about H. P. Lovecraft
Books about Robert E. Howard